Francisco Martínez Jiménez (born 15 June 1973), known as Keko, is a Spanish retired footballer who played as a striker.

He amassed Segunda División totals of 160 games and 44 goals over five seasons, representing in the competition Terrassa, Tenerife and Poli Ejido. He added 387 matches and 141 goals in the Segunda División B, where he spent the better part of his 18-year senior career.

Club career
Keko was born in Barcelona, Catalonia. During his career, spent mainly in the Segunda División B, he played for 14 clubs, mostly in his native region. His first full season in the competition was 1993–94, when he helped UE Figueres to the fourth position.

From 2002, Keko played five consecutive campaigns in the Segunda División, starting with Terrassa FC then scoring an average of 13 league goals for CD Tenerife – although the team never promoted to La Liga– adding two years with Andalusia's Polideportivo Ejido. In January 2007, the 33-year-old returned to the third tier, signing with UE Lleida.

References

External links

1973 births
Living people
Spanish footballers
Footballers from Barcelona
Association football forwards
Segunda División players
Segunda División B players
Tercera División players
AEC Manlleu footballers
UE Figueres footballers
CE L'Hospitalet players
CE Sabadell FC footballers
FC Cartagena footballers
CD Toledo players
Terrassa FC footballers
CD Tenerife players
Polideportivo Ejido footballers
UE Lleida players
CF Gavà players
UE Sant Andreu footballers